Chen Run'er (born October 1957) is a Chinese politician who served as the Communist Party Secretary of Ningxia Hui Autonomous Region from October 2019 to March 2022. He formerly served as Governor of Henan Province, the Deputy Communist Party Chief of Heilongjiang Province, and Party Chief of the cities of Changsha and Xiangtan in his home province of Hunan.

Biography
Chen Run'er was born in October 1957 in Chaling County, Hunan Province. He joined the work force in September 1975, and the Chinese Communist Party three months later. From 1983 to 1985 he studied agriculture at Hunan Agricultural University.

Chen spent most of his early career in the government of Chaling County, rising to county magistrate in 1987, and county party chief in 1990. In 1992 he became Mayor of Chenzhou, then a county-level city. Two years later he became deputy party chief of Chenzhou Prefecture. From 1993 to 1996 he studied at the graduate school of the Central Party School on a part-time basis. In 1997 he became deputy party chief of Loudi Prefecture. In April 2000 Chen was appointed Mayor of the prefecture-level city of Xiangtan (acting until January 2001), and Party Chief of Xiangtan in 2003. In November 2006 he became Party Chief of Changsha, the capital of Hunan.

In April 2013, Chen was transferred to Heilongjiang in Northeast China to serve as the province's Deputy Party Chief. In November 2014, when the Central Commission for Discipline Inspection sent a team to Heilongjiang, a Radio Free Asia columnist predicted that Chen Run'er would likely fall due to corruption, and overseas Chinese news site Boxun even reported that Chen had been arrested. The prediction did not materialize. In March 2016, Chen was transferred to Henan Province in central China as Deputy Party Chief and Governor Designate. On 7 April 2016, the Henan Provincial People's Congress duly elected Chen as Governor of Henan, succeeding Xie Fuzhan, who had become the provincial party chief. On 25 October 2019, he has appointed as the Communist Party Secretary of Ningxia Hui Autonomous Region.

On April 20, he was made vice chairperson of the National People's Congress Agriculture and Rural Affairs Committee.

Chen was an alternate member of the 17th and the 18th Central Committees of the Chinese Communist Party, and is a full member of the 19th Central Committee.

He is considered to be an Ethnic Affairs policy specialist.

References

1957 births
Living people
Chinese Communist Party politicians from Hunan
People's Republic of China politicians from Hunan
Political office-holders in Hunan
Political office-holders in Heilongjiang
Political office-holders in Ningxia
Governors of Henan
Politicians from Zhuzhou
Hunan Agricultural University alumni
Members of the 19th Central Committee of the Chinese Communist Party
Alternate members of the 18th Central Committee of the Chinese Communist Party
Alternate members of the 17th Central Committee of the Chinese Communist Party
Delegates to the 13th National People's Congress